"Tell It to My Heart" is a song performed by American singer, songwriter and actress Taylor Dayne, released in October 1987 as her first single from her first album of the same name (1988). The single was Dayne's first major exposure, and she soon became known for her up-tempo, dance-oriented music. The song was written by Chappell Music staff songwriter Seth Swirsky and Ernie Gold. Swirsky almost did not deliver the song to his publisher after he and his girlfriend decided it was not good enough.

The song debuted on the US Billboard Hot 100 during the week of October 10, 1987, at position number 92, and entered the top 40 of the chart the week of November 14, 1987, rising to number 39 from number 43. Ten weeks later, during the week of January 23, 1988, the single peaked in the number seven spot. The song was present on the Hot 100 for 25 weeks. In the UK, "Tell It To My Heart" reached number three. It was ranked as the 23rd best-selling single of 1988 in the UK. In 1995, "Tell It to My Heart'" was remixed and re-released to promote Dayne's Greatest Hits package. This version climbed to number 23 on the UK Singles Chart.

A Spanish-language version titled "Díselo a mi corazón" was included on Spanish pop group Amistades Peligrosas's 1993 album, La última tentación. In 2002, British singer Kelly Llorenna released her version of the song as a single. It peaked at number nine in the United Kingdom and number 31 in Ireland.

Background
"Tell It To My Heart" reached Taylor Dayne when Dayne contacted Chappell Music and asked to be sent some demos which had been overlooked, although the song had been recorded in early 1987 by Louisa Florio for a self-titled Canadian album release. Dayne recalled feeling an immediate affinity with the song: "I thought there was something about the hook – it's a happy hook." The track was recorded at Cove City Sound Studios in Glen Cove, Long Island. Dayne's father loaned her $6,000 to create the demo. The track took off so unexpectedly in the fall of 1987 that Taylor was forced to complete her debut album at Cove City Sound in eight weeks.

Rich Tancredi used a minimoog with a CV Gate Trigger to mid box for the Bass sound, a TX for bells and his Emulator II for piano. He also used a Prophet-5 for pads and an Oberheim Xpander for horns.

Swirsky would also write, along with Arnie Roman, Dayne's follow-up single "Prove Your Love". For almost two months, only the 12-inch record of "Tell It to My Heart" with four mixes was available for purchase, and ended up selling 900,000 copies alone.

Dayne was nominated for a Grammy Award for Best Pop Vocal, Female for her performance on "Tell It to My Heart" in 1988. Producer Ric Wake said in a 1994 interview with Vibe magazine that "Tell It to My Heart" "really blew people away". Commenting on Taylor Dayne's voice he said "They thought she was, like, black or some kind of ethnic...".

Critical reception
Lysette Cohen from Record Mirror wrote, "The single is one of those unbelievably catchy ones, full of what Taylor calls, "happy hooks". Yet it is more imposing and robust then your average dancefloor ditty. There's real guts in there. A little like the lady herself perhaps?" Another editor, Matthew Collin, felt that the single showed that Dayne "makes a brilliant disco queen".

Music video
Though the music video for "Tell It to My Heart" was very low budget, it displayed Taylor's aggressive and sexy style, showcasing her as the center focus, with two back-up dancers: one of them being "Cats" musical star Jeffrey Pavey, and another dancer on opposite sides against a white backdrop. The video is stylistically similar to the cover of Tell It to My Heart.

Track listings

 7-inch single
 "Tell It to My Heart" – 3:38
 "Tell It to My Heart" (Instrumental) – 3:15

 12-inch maxi
 "Tell It to My Heart" (Club Mix) – 6:46
 "Tell It to My Heart" (Percapella Mix) – 3:21
 "Tell It to My Heart" (Single Mix) – 3:24
 "Tell It to My Heart" (Dub Mix) – 5:47

 12-inch maxi – Remix
 "Tell It to My Heart" (House of Hearts Mix) – 8:43
 "Tell It to My Heart" (Radio Edit) – 3:31
 "Tell It to My Heart" (Dub of Hearts Mix) – 6:43

 2007 "Beautiful" iTunes single & Promo CD single
 "Beautiful"
 "Tell It to My Heart" (2008 version) – 3:41
(Released as the b-side of "Beautiful" on U.S. iTunes and promotional  CD single)

Charts

Weekly charts

Year-end charts

Certifications

Cover versions
 In 1993 the Spanish duo Amistades Peligrosas released a Spanish version called "Diselo a mi corazón" on their debut album
 A version by Kelly Llorenna charted in various places in 2002.
Raquela's 2010 cover version was released as a single and ranked at number 12 in the US.
 In 2015, the song was also covered in a Cheetos commercial.
Filatov & Karas's 2016 cover has been certified platinum four times.
 In 2017 Swedish dansband Highlights released a cover version in Sweden.
 In 2019, German rock band Emil Bulls released an alternative metal cover of the song on their cover album Mixtape.

References

Taylor Dayne songs
1987 debut singles
1987 songs
1988 singles
1995 singles
2002 singles
Arista Records singles
Dutch Top 40 number-one singles
European Hot 100 Singles number-one singles
Number-one singles in Austria
Number-one singles in Germany
Number-one singles in Switzerland
Song recordings produced by Ric Wake
Songs written by Seth Swirsky